Bill McTaggart (23 February 1921 – 22 December 2009) was  a former Australian rules footballer who played with Footscray and South Melbourne in the Victorian Football League (VFL).

Notes

External links 
		

1921 births
2009 deaths
Australian rules footballers from Victoria (Australia)
Western Bulldogs players
Sydney Swans players